Princess Alexandrine Irene of Prussia (7 April 1915 – 2 October 1980) was the oldest daughter and fifth child of Wilhelm, German Crown Prince, and Cecilie of Mecklenburg-Schwerin.  Her grandparents were Wilhelm II, German Emperor and his wife Augusta Victoria of Schleswig-Holstein, and Frederick Francis III of Mecklenburg-Schwerin and Grand Duchess Anastasia Mikhailovna of Russia.  Alexandrine was a member of the House of Hohenzollern.

Early life 
Alexandrine was born at the Kronprinzenpalais in Berlin.  Her middle name of Irene (Greek for "peace") was likely given due to her birth during the second year of World War I.  She followed older brothers Wilhelm, Louis Ferdinand, Hubertus, and Frederick.  Alexandrine's only sister, Cecilie, was born in 1917.  Alexandrine was known by the nickname of "Adini" within her family.

It became clear shortly after Alexandrine's birth that she was affected with Down syndrome.  Unlike other disabled royal children, Alexandrine was not hidden away.  She appeared in official family photographs and at events.  She was cared for primarily by her nurse, Selma Boese.  As a teenager, Alexandrine attended the Trüpersche Sonderschule, a school dedicated to the education of young women with special needs.

Alexandrine was confirmed along with her sister Cecilie in October 1934.

Later life and death 
Alexandrine lived most of her later life in Bavaria, first in Pöcking and later near Lake Starnberg.  She was visited there regularly by her family, particularly her brother Louis Ferdinand.

Alexandrine died in 1980 and is buried near her parents and brother Frederick at Hohenzollern Castle.

Gallery

References

1915 births
1980 deaths
Alexandrine
People with Down syndrome
Alexandrine
Royalty and nobility with disabilities